Max Huber may refer to:

 Max Huber (Canadian football) (born 1945), American football player in the Canadian Football League
 Max Huber (graphic designer) (1919–1992), Swiss graphic designer
 Max Huber (statesman) (1874–1960), Swiss lawyer and diplomat